The III Sendai International Music Competition took place in Sendai from May 18-June 24, 2007.

Violin Competition

Palmares

Jury
  Tomotada Soh (chairman)
  Kiyoshi Okayama (vice-chairman)
  Gérard Poulet (vice-chairman)
  Daniel Gaede
  Yuzuko Horigome
  Lewis Kaplan
  Nam-Yun Kim
  Konstanty Kulka
  Victor Pikayzen
  Arve Tellefsen
  Lina Yu

Competition results

Elimination round

May 20–22.
  A-Rah Shin - 86.70
  Alena Baeva - 84.55
  Erin Keefe - 81.91
  Zhijiong Wang - 81.40
  Shanshan Yao - 80.82
  Haruka Nagao - 80.40
  Aya Kiyonaga - 79.70
  Andrey Baranov - 78.73
  Sayaka Chiba - 78.40
  Minjeong Suh - 78.40
  Aska Kawamata - 78.00
  Hannah Choi - 77.91
  Momoko Arai
  Lea Birringer
  Sakura Chiba
  Aleksandra Fedotova
  Yusuke Hayashi
  Samika Honda
  Tadasuke Ijima
  Hayato Ishibashi
  Jason Issokson
  Fuyu Iwaki
  Maxim Kosinov
  Yevgeniy Kostrytskyy
  Dmitry Lukin
  Maria Machowska
  Svetlana Makarova
  Sergey Malov
  Tomer Marcus
  Pedro Meireles
  Tsuyoshi Moriya
  Kinneret Sieradzki
  Vladimir Soluianov
  Eri Takamura
  Eugen Tichindeleanu
  Gerardo Ubaghs
  Xu Yang
  Asami Yamada
  Masanobu Yoda
  Kosuke Yoshikawa

Semifinals

May 26–28.
  Erin Keefe - 88.64
  Andrey Baranov - 87.91
  Alena Baeva - 83.09
  Shin A-Rah - 82.80 
  Haruka Nagao - 78.90
  Sayaka Chiba - 78.90
  Shanshan Yao - 78.73
  Zhijiong Wang - 77.80
  Aya Kiyonaga - 73.90
  Hannah Choi - 73.55
  Aska Kawamata - 72.27 
  Minjeong Suh - 70.00

Finals

June 1–2
 1st Prize
  Alena Baeva - 6 votes
  Erin Keefe - 2 votes
  Sayaka Chiba - 1 vote
 2nd Prize
  Erin Keefe - 5 votes
  Shin A-Rah - 2 votes
  Andrey Baranov - 1 vote
  Haruka Nagao - 1 vote
 3rd Prize
  Shin A-Rah - 5 votes
  Andrey Baranov - 4 votes
 4th Prize
  Andrey Baranov - 4 votes
  Sayaka Chiba - 3 votes
  Haruka Nagao - 3 votes
 5th Prize
  Sayaka Chiba - 6 votes
  Haruka Nagao - 4 votes

Piano Competition

Palmares

Jury
  Minoru Nojima (chairman)
  Katsumi Ueda (vice-chairman)
  Peter Rösel (vice-chairman)
  Willem Brons
  Daejin Kim
  Michie Koyama
  Dominique Merlet
  Cécile Ousset
   Elisso Virsaladze
   Oxana Yablonskaya
  Guangren Zhou

Competition results

Elimination round

June 10–12.
  Ka-Ling Colleen Lee - 91.27
  Ilya Ovchinnikov - 87.82
  Yuya Tsuda - 87.64
  Yi-Chih Lu - 85.73
  Vyacheslav Gryaznov - 85.45
  Alexander Osminin - 85.20
  Brian Hsu - 85.09
  Yoshihiro Nagase - 81.64
   Shorena Tsintsavadze - 81.55
  Oxana Shevchenko - 81.18
  Esther Birringer - 81.00
  Megumi Shimanuki - 80.50
  Angelo Arciglione
  László Borbely
  Moye Chen
  Árpád Dányi
  Tanya Gabrielian
  Jing Gong
  Cyril Guillotin
  Christopher Guzmán
  Duanduan Hao 
  Shinnosuke Inugai
  Kazuo Irie
  Chie Kamino
  Jun Kaneko
  Alexander Karpeyev
  Takuro Maeda
  Maiko Mine
  Olga Monakh
  Koki Murata
  Sandra Nam
  Takaya Sano
   Nina Sarapyan
  Anna Shakina
  Jia Shi
  Yuki Sunamura
  Hsiang Tu

Semifinals

June 16–18.
  Oxana Shevchenko - 88.73
  Ilya Ovchinnikov - 86.64
  Yuya Tsuda - 86.09
  Vyacheslav Gryaznov - 84.73 
  Yi-Chih Lu - 84.55
  Ka-Ling Colleen Lee - 83.82
  Megumi Shimanuki - 79.90
  Esther Birringer - 79.64
  Brian Hsu - 79.09
  Yoshihiro Nagase - 78.18
  Alexander Osminin - 73.30 
   Shorena Tsintsavadze - 00.00 (disqualified)

Finals

June 22–23
 1st Prize
  Yuya Tsuda - 8 votes
  Ka-Ling Colleen Lee - 1 vote
  Ilya Ovchinnikov - 1 vote
  Oxana Shevchenko - 1 vote
 2nd Prize
  Yi-Chih Lu - 6 votes
  Oxana Shevchenko - 5 votes
 3rd Prize
  Oxana Shevchenko - 7 votes
  Ka-Ling Colleen Lee - 2 votes
  Ilya Ovchinnikov - 2 votes
 4th Prize
  Ilya Ovchinnikov - 6 votes
  Ka-Ling Colleen Lee - 5 votes
 5th Prize
  Ka-Ling Colleen Lee - 8 votes
  Vyacheslav Gryaznov - 3 votes

See also
 List of Sendai International Music Competition winners

References
  Sendai International Music Competition - 3rd Sendai IMC Highlight

Sendai International Music Competition
2007 in Japanese music
May 2007 events in Japan
June 2007 events in Japan